Gardineria is a genus of corals belonging to the family Gardineriidae.

The species of this genus are found in Pacific, Indian and Atlantic Ocean.

Species:

Gardineria hawaiiensis 
Gardineria minor 
Gardineria paradoxa 
Gardineria philippinensis 
Gardineria simojovelensis 
Gardineria simplex

References

Gardineriidae
Scleractinia genera